Brian McGreal (1935−2007) (known as Sharkey) was an Australian rugby league player from the 1960s.

Born in Balmain, New South Wales and raised near Henson Park, 'Sharkey' McGreal was a Newtown Jets junior who went on to play 3 seasons of first grade with Newtown (1960–62). A tough uncompromising prop forward, McGreal was a crowd favourite at Henson Park  and had a long association with the Newtown Blue Bags.

Brian McGreal died on 14 July 2007, 5 days before his 72nd birthday.

References

1935 births
2007 deaths
Newtown Jets players
Australian rugby league players
Rugby league props
Rugby league players from Sydney